Pierre Franey (January 13, 1921 – October 15, 1996) was a French chef, best known for his televised cooking shows and his "60 Minute Gourmet" column in The New York Times.

Early years 
Franey grew up in northern Burgundy, France.  As a young man, he was in the United States at the outbreak of World War II, cooking in the French Pavilion at the 1939 New York World's Fair, and remained in New York rather than returning to Occupied France.  He turned down an offer to become the cook for Douglas MacArthur.  Franey served as a machine gunner in the U.S. Army.

Le Pavillon 
After the war, Henri Soulé, who ran the French Pavilion's kitchen, re-opened Le Pavillon in New York City, and Franey became executive chef in 1952. Franey, along with Jacques Pépin, then an aspiring young cook on the staff of Le Pavillon, was hired in 1960 by the hotel and restaurant entrepreneur Howard Johnson, Sr., (a regular client at Le Pavillon) to revamp some of the Howard Johnson's restaurant chain's recipes. The nine to five, week-day job allowed Pierre to spend more time with his family and collaborate with New York Times food writer Craig Claiborne on weekends, often in East Hampton, NY, creating recipes for The New York Times as well as assisting with restaurant reviews.

60-Minute Gourmet and The New York Times 
Over a twenty-year collaboration, Claiborne and Franey wrote weekly food articles, restaurant reviews and Sunday Magazine recipes for The Times and co-authored ten books. In 1975, Pierre moved on from Howard Johnson's to begin his own syndicated byline, “The 60 Minute Gourmet," for the new “Living" (now Dining) section of The New York Times. His widely read column, which appeared in over 360 newspapers worldwide, led to a second column entitled “Kitchen Equipment," which also appeared in the Times' Living section.

Franey and Claiborne made international headlines in 1975 when Claiborne won a Public Television fundraiser sponsored by American Express for dinner for two with an unlimited budget at any restaurant in the world. Choosing a "small but ruinously expensive" restaurant in Paris called Chez Denis, the two ate and drank their way through thirty-one courses. The check for the single, four-hour meal totaled over $4,000 including taxes and tip, creating considerable controversy in the press.

Television shows 
In 1989, Franey launched his national television career on public television with a cooking series titled Cuisine Rapide. Quickly becoming a hit, the series led to a companion book of the same title, followed by additional shows including Cooking in America and Cooking in France, which won the James Beard Foundation Award for the best cooking show in 1995, and finally Cooking in Europe.

Bibliography 
In 1994, along with colleagues from The New York Times, Richard Flaste and Bryan Miller, Franey wrote his memoir A Chef's Tale, interweaving his personal story with his passion for food, memorable meals, and favorite recipes. Franey authored or co-authored an additional 15 cookbooks including The 'New' New York Times Cookbook and The 60-Minute Gourmet. His final book, Pierre Franey Cooks With His Friends, was co-written in 1996 with his eldest daughter, Claudia Franey Jensen, as a companion to his public television series Cooking in Europe. The book was nominated for a James Beard Award that year.

A Chef's Tale (Memoir)
60-Minute Gourmet
More 60-Minute Gourmet
Cooking with the 60-Minute Gourmet
The New New York Times Cookbook
Classic French Cooking - Foods of the World
Veal Cookery - Craig Claiborne and Pierre Franey
The Seafood Cookbook - From Classic to Contemporary
Pierre Franey's Kitchen
Cooking with Craig Claiborne and Pierre Franey
Pierre Franey's Low-Calorie Gourmet
Craig Claiborne's Gourmet Diet
Cuisine Rapide
Pierre Franey's Cooking in America
Pierre Franey's Cooking in France
Pierre Franey Cooks with his Friends

Awards and honors 
Decorated several times by the French government, including the National Merite of France, Franey held an honorary doctorate from Johnson & Wales University, served on the boards of the Culinary Institute of America and Johnson & Wales University, and was a past president of The Vatel Club, a French food industry organization founded in 1913 in New York.  He was honored by the March of Dimes in 1985 with a Hirschfeld caricature drawing for his extensive fundraising work for that organization.

Last years and legacy 
Franey died in 1996 shortly after suffering a stroke while giving a shipboard cooking demonstration aboard the Cunard ocean liner, Queen Elizabeth 2. He is buried in Green River Cemetery in Springs, New York, East Hampton, on Long Island. He was survived by his wife, Betty, and three children, Claudia, Diane, and Jacques. Scholarships are bequeathed in his honor at Johnson & Wales University in Providence, Rhode Island, and The Culinary Institute of America in Hyde Park, New York.

References

External links

Goodbye mag profile
New York Times obituary
New York Times story about Paris dinner
Franey article appearing in the 23-JUL-1981 Gainesville Sun, via the NYT News Service, giving insight to Franey's writing style and sharing his insight on an important Chef's tool that's little known outside of professional kitchens

1921 births
1996 deaths
American food writers
The New York Times writers
French chefs
French emigrants to the United States
People from Yonne
People from Springs, New York
20th-century American non-fiction writers
Culinary Institute of America people
Burials at Green River Cemetery